Ilići is a suburban neighborhood of Mostar, Bosnia and Herzegovina, centered on the main strip of Ilićka Street immediately west of downtown and extending until the spring of Radobolja river.

Ilići is located at 43.3472 N, 17.7681 E, at an average elevation of 90 metres.

Demographics 
According to the 2013 census, its population was 2,585.

Gallery

References

Populated places in Mostar
Villages in the Federation of Bosnia and Herzegovina